Cherrywood is a developing suburb of Dublin, Ireland, bordering Cabinteely, Loughlinstown and Rathmichael. It is located to the southeast of the city, in Dún Laoghaire–Rathdown. The development commenced on a greenfield site in 1998 and primarily comprises Cherrywood Business Park and some residential development, with retail development and a hotel also planned.

Location
Cherrywood lies between the M50 motorway and the N11 road, about a kilometre north of where they fork from the M11. Cherrywood is divided by the R118 regional road which runs northeast to southwest through the area, crossing the N11 at Wyattville Road and joining the M50 at Junction 16. The business park (originally Cherrywood Science and Technology Park and later The Campus Cherrywood) lies south of this road and there is a residential zone to the north.

History
Cherrywood is being formed around the business park, in a deliberate process under a Cherrywood-Carrickmines Local Area Plan, the 2004 and later County Development Plans, and a related Cherrywood-Rathmichael Area Plan. Cherrywood is designated as a District Centre, and limits apply to certain forms of development there. In total the business park has an area of approximately 400 acres with, as of 2018, much of it still undeveloped.

Business park development 

In 1998 the first office buildings were developed in what was then branded "Cherrywood Business Park". Development proceeded slowly and, as with other planned developments in Ireland, the property crash in 2008 affected Cherrywood. In 2015, when several buildings were still empty while other planned developments were incomplete, some reports described parts of the development as a "ghost town".

New management 
In 2012, investors created a new management company to market the area again after the collapse of Liam Carroll's development company. This was backed by AIB Bank and Danske Bank (parent company of National Irish Bank). Parts of the area received a facelift, and the "facilities building", which had previously only housed a food outlet, was expanded to include a gym. Most of the main office buildings are owned by the same company.  

A new master plan was made and approved by the local authority, including plans for over 1,200 apartments and over 500,000 square feet of commercial space, including a hotel.

Rebranding and further development 

Following a €145m acquisition by Spear Street Capital of the eight office blocks comprising the development in January 2018, the business park was rebranded as "The Campus Cherrywood". Proceeds from the deal were later used to develop the surrounding area.

Plans to open a new life-sciences incubation and acceleration facility in the area were announced in October 2021. The new facility was planned to provide 18 labs and 9 offices over 30,000 square feet of space, and create 100 jobs in the sector.

Major tenants 
The main tenant in the development is Dell, which has its "Dublin Campus" at Cherrywood. Other notable tenants include Aviva, Elavon, and Ireland-based multinational IT and consulting company, Accenture.

Transport

Luas
The Luas Green Line was extended from Sandyford to Cherrywood. Construction started in February 2007 and the line became operational on 16 October 2010. There are two Luas stops in Cherrywood: the eponymous Cherrywood, and the current terminus at Brides Glen.

Amenities
As of mid-2018, facilities included an all-weather multi-purpose playing pitch, a sports pavilion, tennis courts, cycle paths and greenways. Three parks were in formation, with more than 3,000 trees already planted. By 2021, four parks were under development, Tully Park and Lehaunstown Park, named for nearby localities, Ticknick Park and Beckett Park.

Permission having been granted for a first primary school, a 24-classroom facility, as of October 2021 the building was under construction and a reduced version of the school operating out of temporary premises.

References

Sources

 Dún Laoghaire, Dublin: Dún Laoghaire-Rathdown County Development Plan, 2004; Dún Laoghaire-Rathdown County Council; Sections 1 and 3

Places in Dún Laoghaire–Rathdown
Planned communities in the Republic of Ireland